AmoebaDB is a  functional genomics database for the genetics of amoebozoa.

See also
 Amoebozoa

References

External links
 AmoebaDB

Genome databases